The Halford Special was a Grand Prix racing car of the 1920s built by engine designer Major Frank Halford on the chassis of an early Side Valve Aston Martin tourer. It was one of the most advanced British-built racing cars of the mid-1920s and had many racing successes. Halford himself was a freelance engine designer who did work for both the de Havilland Aircraft Company and Napier & Son.

History 
In 1922 Bamford & Martin company (that later became Aston Martin) produced cars to compete at the Brooklands racing circuit, for Grand Prix racing, and to set world speed and endurance records. Two works Team Cars with 16-valve twin-cam engines were built for racing, a record car known as the Razor Blade was built, and a number of other cars were built for customers for racing. One of these customer cars, chassis number 1916, registration number OR1, was later re-built as the AM Halford and then again as the Halford Special.

The early racing history of chassis number 1916 is not fully documented but what is certain is that it was crashed in 1924 and Major Halford bought the chassis and installed an engine of his own design and built a new two-seater body for the car.

Major Halford built two 6-cylinder in-line engines for the car. Each had an aluminium cylinder-block and crankcase with steel liners, with rubber seals at their base. Bore and stroke were 63 mm and 80 mm giving 1.5 litres, the Grand Prix formula for 1926. The cylinder heads were cast iron with two camshafts, twelve inclined valves, and two 12 mm plugs per cylinder.

Drawing on his aircraft design skills, Frank Halford's proposed using a turbocharger, but it proved unreliable in tests. (This was probably the first turbocharged road racing car until Renault developed the Alpine turbocharged car in 1968 that went on to become successful Grand Prix cars in the 1970s.  A turbo diesel qualified on the pole at the Indy 500 in 1952, and the turbo Offy first appeared at Indy in 1966 in the Huffaker cars).

When first raced at Brooklands, at the 1925 BARC meeting in August, the car appeared with a two-litre Roots-type supercharger mounted on the front of the crankshaft.

At its first race in 1925, with the 95 bhp engine, the narrow Aston Martin radiator proved to be too small, and a wider and deeper radiator was fitted and the car was renamed more simply the Halford Special.

The second engine had twin magnetos mounted behind the two overhead camshafts and developed 120 bhp and is now installed back in the Halford Special.

Frank Halford raced his car twice in 1925 and 12 times during 1926. The car was fitted with a Berk supercharger, manufactured by PressureVac Ltd., 18a North Parade, Bradford, Yorkshire. Halford then sold the car to Captain G. E. T. Eyston, who would later hold the Land Speed Record, to race during the 1927 season. Captain Eyston raced the Halford Special car three times at Brooklands and achieved fourth place in the Montlhéry French Grand Prix in 1927.

In the 1930s the Halford Special was dismantled by its new owner, Viscount Ridley. The first engine was fitted into a Bugatti Type 35 and the second engine was modified to keep the twin magnetos dry and put into a speedboat that sank soon after and the engine spent two years at the bottom of a lake. The present owner of the Halford Special traced the original parts in the 1970s and re-assembled the Halford Special back to its original condition.

The Halford Special is currently kept at the Grand Prix exhibit at the Brooklands Motor Museum and is still used periodically in Vintage Sports Car Club and other events for historic racing cars. The car was involved in an accident at a VSCC race meeting at Silverstone in 2008 but is now restored back to original condition.

Racing history 1923 to 1928

References

Aston Martin vehicles
1920s in motorsport
Cars introduced in 1923
Grand Prix cars